Events from 2012 in Catalonia.

Incumbents

 President of the Generalitat of Catalonia – Artur Mas

Events
 11 September – Some 1.5 million people take part in Catalonia's annual independence rally in Barcelona.
 20 September – The Spanish prime minister rejects a call from Catalonia's leader for fiscal independence, days after a giant pro-autonomy rally in Barcelona.
 25 September – Artur Mas announces that Catalonia will hold early elections on November 25
 26 November – Voters of Catalonia return a clear majority of pro-separatist parties to the Catalan Parliament
 19 December – Artur Mas of the conservative Convergence and Union party and Oriol Junqueras of the Republican Left of Catalonia agree to form a new government and hold a referendum on independence.

See also

 2012 in Spain

References